The Luigi Galvani Medal is an award given by the Italian Chemical Society (Società Chimica Italiana).  Named after pioneering Italian physicist Luigi Galvani, the prize was established in 1986 to recognize the work of foreign scientists in the field of electrochemistry.

Recipients
Source: Italian Chemical Society
 2015  (UK)
 2011 Akira Fujishima (Japan)
 2009 Michael Grätzel (Switzerland)
 2007 Christian Amatore (France)
 2004 Royce W. Murray (USA)
 2002  (Argentina)
 2000  (Germany)
 1998 Colin Vincent (UK)
 1997 Jean-Michel Savéant (France)
 1994 Marcel Pourbaix (Belgium)
 1992 Allen J. Bard (USA)
 1991 Brian E. Conway (Canada)
 1988 Heinz Gerischer (Germany)
 1986 Roger Parsons (UK)

See also

 List of chemistry awards

References

External links
 Website of the Italian Chemical Society (in Italian)

Chemistry awards
Italian science and technology awards
Awards established in 1986